Bartolomeo I della Scala (died 7 or 8 March 1304) was lord of Verona from 1301, a member of the Scaliger family and protector of Dante during his exile from Florence.

The son of Alberto I della Scala, Bartolomeo succeeded him after his death in 1301. He had married in 1291 Costanza di Antiochia, daughter of Corrado d'Antiochia.

Bartolomeo died in 1304. His brother Alboino succeeded him.

References

A. Castagnetti, G. M. Varanini, Il Veneto nel medioevo: Le signorie trecentesche, Verona, Banca Popolare di Verona, 1995.

Scala, Bartolomeo 1
Scala, Bartolomeo 1
Bartolomeo 1
Lords of Verona